Bruno Alejandro Pittón (born 1 February 1993) is an Argentine professional footballer who plays as a left-back for San Lorenzo.

Career
Pittón began his career with Unión Santa Fe, being promoted into the first-team in 2015 and subsequently making his debut in a 0–0 draw against Olimpo on 7 September 2015. Before his debut, Pittón spent time on loan at Torneo Federal A team Sportivo Las Parejas. Two more appearances came during the 2015 Argentine Primera División season before he played in 14 games in 2016 and also scored his first career goal; in a 3–6 loss against Racing Club de Avellaneda on 7 March 2016. A week later, Bruno and his brother Mauro played together for the first time in a Primera División game against Boca Juniors.

In June 2019, Unión Santa Fe revealed San Lorenzo had agreed a deal in principle, subject to terms and medicals, for Bruno Pittón and his brother Mauro. They completed their moves on 22 June. After appearances in either leg against Cerro Porteño as they exited the Copa Libertadores, Pittón scored on his first and second game in the Primera División versus Gimnasia y Esgrima and Rosario Central.

Personal life
He is the brother of fellow footballer Mauro Pittón.

Career statistics
.

References

External links

1993 births
Living people
Footballers from Santa Fe, Argentina
Argentine people of Italian descent
Argentine footballers
Association football defenders
Argentine Primera División players
Torneo Federal A players
Unión de Santa Fe footballers
Sportivo Las Parejas footballers
San Lorenzo de Almagro footballers